Whatever the Road is a studio album by Jason Crabb. Reunion Records released the album on September 18, 2015. Crabb worked with Jason Ingram and Paul Mabury, in the production of this album.

Critical reception

Awarding the album four and a half stars from CCM Magazine, Kevin Sparkman writes, "We certainly agree that the music is wonderful." DeWayne Hamby, reviewing the album for Charisma, writes, "one of Christian music's most distinctive vocalist continues to expand his audience with Whatever the Road...10 songs about Jesus, freedom, heaven, life and encouragement."

Jonathan Andre, rating the album four stars at 365 Days of Inspiring Media, states, "Whatever the Road is an example of an album that reminds us all what good quality singing is all about, and what it means production-wise to have the likes of Paul Mabury and Jason Ingram helping with an album." Giving the album four and a half stars for The Christian Beat, Sarah Baylor says, "Jason has crafted such a genuine and heartfelt record that is so incredibly relatable to each and every listener."

Track listing

Charts

References

2015 albums
Reunion Records albums